Solomianskyi District (translit. Solom’ians’kyi raion, "district of Solomianka") is a district in Kyiv, the capital of Ukraine. Located in the western part of the city, in the basin of Lybid river, Dniepr's tributary. Named after village of Solomianka that became part of Kyiv in 1858. Established as a district in 1921. Reogarnized in 2001. An area of the district was settled since the Middle Ages. The so-called mount of Batu Khan who invaded Kyiv in 1240 is located within the district.

Neighbourhoods
 Grushki (Грушки) — hamlet of the 19th century. During 1871–1902 it belonged to nobleman K. Grushko (hence got its name).
 Karavayevi Dachi (Караваєві Дачі, "Karavayev's cottages") — area of border outposts outside of Kyiv in the XII—XIII c. In 1872 it was purchased by Russian doctor Vladimir Karavayev.
 Vidradnyi Відрадний 
 Shuliavka (Шулявка) — mentioned under 1146 in the Hypatian Codex. In the 18th century this area was a residence of the Orthodox metropolitan bishops of Kyiv.
 Batyieva Hora (Батиєва Гора) - former village, now historical neighbourhood, where Batyievi caves, remains of the Zarubintsy culture, were found

Education 
 Igor Sikorsky Kyiv Polytechnic Institute

Gallery

External links
 solor.gov.ua - Solomianka Raion administration website 
 Солом`янка in Wiki-Encyclopedia Kyiv 

 
Urban districts of Kyiv